Naked Fireman is a 2017 South Korean television series starring Lee Joon-hyuk, Jung In-sun, Jo Hee-bong, Park Hoon, Seo Jeong-yeon and Lee Won-jong. It aired on KBS2 on Wednesdays and Thursdays at 22:00 (KST) from January 12 to January 19, 2017 for 4 episodes.

Cast

Main cast
Lee Joon-hyuk as Kang Cheol-soo
Ahn Do-gyu as young Kang Cheol-soo
Jung In-sun as Han Jin-ah
 as young Han Jin-ah
Jo Hee-bong as Kwon Jeong-nam
Park Hoon as Oh Sung-jin
 Ryu Ui-hyun as young Oh Sung-jin
Seo Jeong-yeon as Han Song-ja
Lee Won-jong as Jang Gwang-ho

119 Emergency Center
 as Nam-il
Park Ji-hoon as Dae-young
Lee Do-gyeom as Joon-ho

Extended cast
Gil Hae-yeon as Jeong-soon
 as Seung-jae

Others
 Kim Soo-jin

Lee Jeong-in

Cha Myung-wook
Gong Sang-ah
Kim Nam-woo

Kim Jae-cheol

Ratings
In the table below, the blue numbers represent the lowest ratings and the red numbers represent the highest ratings.

Awards and nominations

References

External links
  
 Naked Fireman at Urban Works Media's Naver blog
 
 
 

2017 South Korean television series debuts
2017 South Korean television series endings
Korean Broadcasting System television dramas
Korean-language television shows
South Korean action television series
Television series by Urban Works Media